Cram and Ferguson Architects is an architecture firm based in Concord, Massachusetts. The company was founded as a partnership in 1889 by the "preeminent American Ecclesiastical Gothicist" Ralph Adams Cram and Charles Francis Wentworth. In 1890 they were joined by Bertram Goodhue, who was made a partner in 1895.

The firm name has changed as partners have changed and names have included: Cram and Wentworth, Cram Goodhue and Wentworth, Cram Goodhue and Ferguson, Cram and Ferguson, Cram and Ferguson Architects, Hoyle, Doran and Berry and HDB/Cram and Ferguson all successor firms to the original partnership of Ralph Adams Cram and Charles Francis Wentworth.

Frank Ferguson, their structural engineer, was made a partner on Wentworth's death in 1905 making the firm one of the earliest A/E firms. Hoyle, Doran and Berry, Inc. the partnership formed by Alexander Hoyle and John Doran continuing the unbroken succession descending from original Cram collaborators in 1958, HDB/Cram and Ferguson was the partnership of David H. Hulihan long time employee of Cram and Ferguson and Ethan Anthony AIA. That partnership was reformed in 2008 on the retirement of President David H. Hulihan and the firm reverted to its traditional name of Cram and Ferguson Architects under the leadership of Ethan Anthony AIA.

In 1931, in Cram's waning years, Arthur Tappan North wrote in his Monograph on the firm's work:

Since 1990 Cram and Ferguson under the leadership of the American Architect; Ethan Anthony is completing new church and academic work including: the St. Thomas Aquinas University Church at the University of Virginia at Charlottesville, The Shrine of Our Lady of Good Voyage at Boston Seaport, Massachusetts and the St. Kateri Tekakwitha Catholic Church at Ridgway, Illinois. Major work the last fifteen years, the Benedictine Monastery of Syon Abbey on the Blue Ridge Parkway in Floyd, Virginia, The Phillips Chapel at the Canterbury School in Greensboro, North Carolina and The Edward's Chapel at The Casady School in Oklahoma City, Oklahoma.

Historic projects

Religious architecture 

All Saints Church Ashmont – Dorchester, MA, 1891
 Saint Paul's Episcopal Church – Brockton, MA, 1891-94
 Swedenborgian Church, 1893 – Newton, MA
 Church of Saint Peter and Paul – Fall River, MA, 1893
Christ Church – Hyde Park, MA, 1893
 St. Luke's Church – Roxbury, MA, 1895
 Second Congregational Church (Phillips Church) – Exeter, NH, 1895-98
St. Stephen's Episcopal Church – Cohasset, MA, 1899
Emmanuel Church – Newport, RI, 1900
 St. Paul's Episcopal Church – Chicago, IL, 1902
 First Baptist Church – Pittsburgh, PA, 1902
 All Saints Chapel, University of the South – Sewanee, TN, 1903
 Christ Church Cathedral Competition (project) – Victoria, British Columbia, 1903
 St. John in the Wilderness Episcopal Cathedral (project) – Denver, CO, 1903
 First Unitarian Church – West Newton, MA, 1905
 Westminster Presbyterian Church – Springfield, IL, 1905
All Saints Cathedral – Halifax, Nova Scotia, 1906
Calvary Episcopal Church – Pittsburgh, PA, 1906
 Glens Falls Presbyterian Church – Glens Falls, NY, 1906
St. Thomas Episcopal Church – New York, NY, 1907
Trinity Memorial Church (now St. Andrew's) – Denver, CO, 1907
Church of the Covenant – Cleveland, OH, 1907
St. Paul's Episcopal Cathedral – Detroit, MI, 1908-11
 Church and Rectory (project) – Guantanamo, Cuba, 1908
 Russell Sage Memorial First Presbyterian Church – Far Rockaway, NY, 1908
 St. Mary's Church – Walkerville, Ontario, 1908
 Cathedral of the Incarnation (project) – Diocese of Baltimore, MD, 1908
 Church of the Ascension – Montgomery, AL, 1910
St. James Episcopal Church – New York, NY, 1911-24
 St. Paul's Episcopal Church – Malden, MA, 1911
 Grace Episcopal Church Parish House – Manchester, NH, 1911
House of Hope Presbyterian Church – St. Paul, MN, 1916-26
Fourth Presbyterian Church – Chicago, IL, 1912
 Church of the New Jerusalem – Bryn Athyn, PA 1912
 First Presbyterian Church – Oakland, CA, 1912-13
All Saints Episcopal Church – Peterborough, NH, 1913-21
Trinity Episcopal Church (addition) – Princeton, NJ, 1914
 Chapel for the Sisters of St. Anne – Arlington, MA, 1914
 St. Elizabeth Chapel at Whitehall – Sudbury, MA, 1914
First Universalist Church – Somerville, MA, 1916
 Ellingwood Funerary Chapel – Nahant, MA, 1919
 St. James Church – Lake Delaware, NY, 1920
Trinity Episcopal Church – Houston, TX, 1920
Sacred Heart Church – Jersey City, NJ, 1921
 Central Union Church – Honolulu, HI, 1922
First Presbyterian Church – Tacoma, WA, 1923
 Trinity Methodist Episcopal Church – Durham, NC, 1923
 First Presbyterian Church – Jamestown, NY, 1923
 St. Paul's Episcopal Church – Yonkers, NY, 1924
Cathedral of St. John the Divine – New York, NY, 1925-31
St. Mary's Catholic Church – Detroit, MI, 1925
Emmanuel Church (project) – Rockford, IL, 1927
St. Paul's Church – Winston-Salem, NC 1927
American Church of Paris – Paris, France, 1927
St. Florian's Church – Detroit, MI, 1928
Prince Memorial Chapel (project) – Fort Myer, VA, 1929
St. Vincent's Church – Los Angeles, CA, 1927
Christ Church – United Methodist Church – New York, NY, 1929
All Saints Episcopal Church (addition) – Brookline, MA, 1929
Klise Memorial Chapel East Congregational UCC Church – Grand Rapids, MI, 1929
Mishawaka Cathedral (project) – Mishawaka, IN, 1930
East Liberty Presbyterian Church – Pittsburgh, PA, 1931
Second Unitarian Church – Boston, MA, 1934
Blank Church (project) – Chicago, IL, 1935
Conventual Church of Sts. Mary and John – Cambridge, MA, 1936
All Saints Episcopal Church – Winter Park, FL, 1938
St. Thomas Church – Peoria, IL, 1939

Academic architecture 

 Wheaton College – Norton, MA, 1898-1932
Wallace Library
Cole Memorial Chapel
Kilham Hall
Sweet Briar College – Sweet Briar, VA, 1902-66
United States Military Academy – West Point, NY, 1904-1923
Cadet Chapel
Headquarters Building
Princeton University – Princeton, NJ, 1906-29
Graduate College
Proctor Hall
University Chapel
Cleveland Tower
Campbell Hall
McCormick School of Art and Architecture
Rice University – Houston, TX, 1908-57
Administration Building (Lovett Hall)
Campus Master Plan
Mechanical Engineering Laboratory
Westhampton College, University of Richmond – Richmond, VA, 1910-16
 St. Mary's School – Peekskill, NY, 1911
Phillips Exeter Academy – Exeter, NH, 1911-37
Dormitories
Williams College – Williamstown, MA, 1912-38
Williams Hall
Chapins Hall
Stetson Hall Library
Sage Hall
Gate between William and Sage
Mears House
Lehman Hall
Heating Plant
Adams Memorial Theatre
Fayerweather Hall
Mercersburg Academy Chapel – Mercersburg, PA, 1916-26
The Masters School – Dobbs Ferry, NY, 1919 
Tsuda University – Hokkaido, Japan, 1919
Dominican University – River Forest, IL, 1920
 St. George's Chapel – Newport, RI, 1923-29
Choate School – Wallingford, CT, 1924-25
University of Notre Dame, South Dining Hall – South Bend, Indiana, 1927
St. Paul's School – Concord, NH, 1927-37
 St. Alban's Choir School – Washington, D.C., 1929
 Gibson Chapel, The Blue Ridge School – Dyke, VA, 1929
Rollins College Chapel – Winter Park, FL, 1930
University of Southern California, Doheny Library – Los Angeles, CA, 1930
Wellesley College – Wellesley, MA, 1930
Boston University – Boston, MA, 1930-66
 St. Mary's High School and Grammar School – Glens Falls, NY, 1930
Swarthmore College – Swarthmore, PA, 1938

Residential, institutional, and commercial architecture 

Eddy Residence – Newton, MA, 1888
 Edward Courtland Gale Residence – Williamstown, MA, 1890
 Kennedy Road – Cambridge, MA, 1890
 Eugene Fellner Residence – Brookline, MA, 1890
 126 and 128 Brattle Street – Cambridge MA, 1892
 165 Winthrop Street – Brookline, MA, 1892
 Bushy Hill – Simsbury, CT, 1893
Richmond Court Apartments – Brookline, MA, 1898
 Harbor Court – Newport, RI, 1904
Charles Barron Residence – Beacon Street, Boston, MA, 1907
 House on the Moors – Gloucester, MA, 1917
 Blanche Sewall Residence – Houston, TX, 1924
Paul Watkins House – Winona, MN, 1925
 Angelica Livingston Gerry Residence – Lake Delaware, NY, 1926
 Chickamauga Memorial Arch – Chickamauga, TN, 1897
 Washington Hotel – Colon, Panama, 1910
 Edward Courtland Gale Mausoleum – Troy, NY, 1914
 Woodrow Wilson Memorial – Washington DC, 1925
 Memorial Chapel, American Military Cemetery – Belleau Wood, France, 1926
World War I Memorial Carillon – Richmond, VA, 1926
Oise-Aisne American Military Cemetery Memorial – Fère-en-Tardenois, France, 1926
Deborah Cook Sayles Public Library – Pawtucket, RI, 1893
Public Library – Fall River, MA, 1899
 Hunt Library – Nashua, NH, 1902
Lucius Beebe Memorial Library – Wakefield, MA, 1921
Houston Public Library – Houston, TX, 1926
 Parker Hill Branch, Boston Public Library – Roxbury, MA, 1929
 National Life Insurance Building – Montpelier, VT, 1921
McCormack Federal Building – Boston, MA, 1929
Portsmouth Harbor Front Renewal – Portsmouth, NH, 1933
 District Court Building – Dedham, MA, 1937
Holy Cross Monastery – West Park, NY, 1934
Bourne and Sagamore Bridges – Cape Cod, MA, 1938
New England Mutual Life Insurance Headquarters – Boston, MA, 1938
 The People's Savings Bank – Providence, RI, 1944
The John Hancock Life Insurance Company Headquarters Building – Boston, MA, 1946
Currier Museum of Art in Manchester, New Hampshire
The Berkeley Building, 200 Berkeley Street, Boston, Massachusetts

Recent projects 

 Phillips Academy Renovations, Phillips Church- Exeter, NH, 2000
 Cathedral of Our Lady of Walsingham – Houston, TX, 2000
 All Saints' Church Peterborough (Addition) – Peterborough, NH, 2000
 Canterbury School Bell Tower – Greensboro, NC, 2000
 Casady School – Oklahoma City, OK, 2001
 West Transept 
 St. Edwards Chapel, 2012
 Records Mausoleum – Oklahoma City, OK, 2002
 Gale Mausoleum Restoration – Troy, NY, 2002
 St. John Neumann Catholic Church – Knoxville, TN, 2005
 St. Andrews Episcopal Church Restoration – Denver, CO, 2009
 The Bradford Mill, "Wheelhouse" Project – Concord, MA, 2010
 Valley of Our Lady Monastery Design – Prairie Du Sac, WI, 2011
 Church of the Incarnation – Dallas, TX, 2012
 Hunt Memorial Building Restoration – Nashua, NH, 2012
 The Church of the Open Word Preservation – Newton, MA, 2014
 St. Kateri Tekakwitha Parish – Ridgeway, IL, 2015
 The Shrine of Our Lady of Good Voyage – Boston Seaport, MA, 2017
 Sister of St. Thomas Aquinas – Brooksville, FL, 2019
Emmanuel Baptist Church Restoration – Worcester, MA, 2019

Awards 

 2019 AIA CM Awards – Emmanuel Baptist Church
 Real Estate and Construction Review Plaque of Honor – Our Lady of Walsingham
2017 AIACM Merit Award for Design Excellence for St. Kateri, Ridgeway, IL
2017 AIACM Merit Award for Design Excellence for St. Andrews, Denver, Colorado
2017 AIACM Citation Award for Design Excellence for Our Lady of the Valley Monastery, Prairie Du Sac, WI
2015 AIACM Honor Award for Design Excellence for additions to, and renovation of, St Edward's Chapel, Oklahoma City
2009 Architect of the Year award from the Macael Institute in Alicante, Spain
2003 Golden Trowel Award for outstanding masonry building of the year for Our Lady of Walsingham Church, Houston, Texas
1993 Honor Award from the Institute for Religious Art and Architecture for St. Elizabeth's Memorial Garden, Sudbury, Massachusetts
1938 and 1949 Boston Society of Architects Harleston Parker Awards for most beautiful building of the year

History 

The practice of the office was started by Ralph Adams Cram in 1889
 In 1890 Mr. Cram became associated with Charles F. Wentworth and later with Bertram G. Goodhue, who became a partner in 1895. Frank W. Ferguson became a partner in 1899
 Mr. Wentworth died in 1899. Mr. Goodhue conducted the New York Office of the firm for some time before his connection was terminated in 1913
 On July 1, 1925, Frank E. Cleveland, Chester Godfrey and Alexander E. Hoyle were admitted to partnership and a new contract was entered into on October 5, 1926. Now four partners
 Mr. Ferguson died October 4, 1926. (Born November 3, 1861, Portsmouth, N.H.)
 Mr. Cram died September 22, 1942, and the partnership continued with the three remaining partners. (Born December 16, 1863, Hampton Falls, N.H.)
 On January 1, 1944, Chester A. Brown, John T. Doran and William H. Owens were admitted to partnership. The firm now consisted of six equal partners
 Mr. Cleveland died July 30, 1950, and a new partnership was entered into on August 1, 1950, with the five remaining partners. (Born Nov. 11, 1877, Richmond, P.Q., Canada)
 Mr. Godfrey died May 5, 1952, and a new partnership was entered into on July 15, 1952, with the remaining four partners – Messrs. Hoyle, Brown, Doran Owens.  (Born April 17, 1878, at Hampton, N.H.)
 Mr. Owens retired April 30, 1953, and a new partnership was entered into on May 1, 1953, with the three remaining partners – Messrs. Hoyle, Brown and Doran
 On May 1, 1954, Maurice A. Berry and Oscar H. Cederlund were admitted to partnership. The firm now consisted of five partners
 Mr. Cederlund died April 23, 1956. Partnership dissolved April 30, 1956. New partnership dated May 1, 1956. Partners now: Messrs. Hoyle, Brown, Doran, Berry
 Mr. Brown retired April 30, 1957. Partnership dissolved April 30, 1957. On May 1, 1957, a new contract was entered into by Messrs. Hoyl, Doran and Berry
 On January 25, 1957, the new was changed to Hoyle, Doran and Berry
 On April 30, 1961, Mr. Hoyle retired. Partnership dissolved April 30, 1961. On May 2, 1961, the following were admitted to partnership: Nisso T. Aladjem, Frank De Bruyn, Robert W. Hadley, Charles P. Harris. There were now six partners
 Mr. Hadley died January 3, 1964. Interim agreement dated January 20, 1964
 Mr. Harris retired January 3, 1966, and a new contract was entered into on January 31, 1966, with the four remaining partners: Messrs. Doran, Berry, Aladjem, De Bruyn
 On August 1, 1965, Austin J. Cribben Jr. was made a partner and a new contract was entered into on February 1, 1966. Partners: Messrs. Doran, Berry, Aladjem, De Bruyn, Cribben
 Hoyle Doran& Berry Inc, was incorporated September 5, 1968; Major Stockholders: Doran, Berry, Aladjem, De Bruyn
 Mr. Hoyle died January 2, 1969
 Mr. De Bruyn died November 15, 1972, after retiring July 31, 1972
 Remaining Partners: Doran, Berry, Aladjem, Cribben
 Mr. Berry retired November 1, 1974
 Mr. Doran died December 14, 1979. Remaining partners: Aladjem, Cribben
 Mr. Brown died June 27, 1980
 Mr. Berry died December 26, 1981. Stockholders as of 1987: Cribben and Aladjem
 December 1990 Ethan Anthony Associates merged with Hoyle Doran & Berry Inc. Ethan Anthony joined David J Hulihan as a majority stockholder
 December 1998 David J. Hulihan Retired, Ethan Anthony became sole Stockholder of Corporation
2008 firm renamed HDB/Cram and Ferguson
 March 31, 2010, Hoyle, Doran & Berry Inc dissolved, Assets acquired by Ethan Anthony
 March 31, 2010, Ethan Anthony founds Cram and Ferguson Architects taking up the ongoing work of Hoyle, Doran & Berry Inc.
 September 10, 2012, Cram and Ferguson Architects, LLC Incorporated in the State of Massachusetts
 December 16, 2013, Cram and Ferguson Architects leads the 150th anniversary celebration of the birth of Ralph Adams Cram
 Mr. Cribben and Mr. Aladjem retired 1987
 David Hulihan became a partner 1987
 Ethan Anthony became a partner 1990
 Mr Aladjem died October 23, 2004
 David Hulihan retires 2008
 Mr Cribben died March 30, 2016
 David Hulihan died May 12, 2018
 January 1, 2019, is the 130th anniversary of continuous practice of Cram and Ferguson Architects, LLC.

Firm names 

 Ralph Adams Cram founded firm – 1889
 Cram & Wentworth – 1890
 Cram, Wentworth & Goodhue – 1895
 Cram, Goodhue & Ferguson – 1899
 Cram and Ferguson Architects – 1913
 Hoyle, Doran and Berry – 1957
 Hoyle, Doran and Berry, Inc. – 1968
 Cram and Ferguson Architects LLC – 2012

Commenced employment 

 C. N. Godfrey – 1900
 A. E. Hoyle – 1908
 C. A. Brown – 1910
 J. T. Doran – 1927
 W. H. Owens – 1921
 M. A. Berry – 1923
 O. H. Cederlund – 1946
 N.T. Aladjem – 1950
 Frank E. De Bruyn – 1926
 R. W. Hadley – 1945
 C. P. Harris – 1955
 A. J. Cribben – 1946
 David J Hulihan – 1967
 Ethan Anthony – 1990

The team 
Kevin Hogan, the project manager, has 20 years of experience with the firm and has participated in numerous major church and chapel projects as the leader for all phases of production and construction administration

Matthew Alderman has been the lead designer on many projects both with Cram and Ferguson and in his prior employments, including St. Kateri Catholic Church in Ridgway, Illinois, St. Thomas Aquinas University Parish in Charlottesville, Virginia, which is now under construction and Our Lady of Good Voyage Chapel in Boston, Massachusetts.

References

Architecture firms based in Massachusetts
New Classical architects
Companies based in Middlesex County, Massachusetts
Concord, Massachusetts